Robert "Rob" Gonsalves (July 10, 1959 – June 14, 2017) was a Canadian painter of magic realism (surrealism). He produced original works, limited edition prints and illustrations for his own books. His style is similar to that of Salvador Dalí or René Magritte.

Early life
Gonsalves was born in Toronto, Ontario. As a teenager, he was inspired by Progressive Rock album cover art of groups like Genesis, Yes, and Gentle Giant. Their fantasy and surrealism sparked his artistic direction. His love of the urban environment and Victorian architecture found its way into his paintings. Rob Gonsalves studied Architecture at Ryerson Technical University and learned how to manipulate perspective. This became an important element in the narrative of his paintings.

He attended the Ontario College of Art and Design for a year.

Career
In his post college years, Gonsalves worked full-time as an architect, also painting trompe-l'œil murals and theatre sets. After an enthusiastic response in 1990 at the Toronto Outdoor Art Exhibition, Gonsalves devoted himself to painting full-time.

Although Gonsalves' work is often categorized as surrealistic, it differs because the images are deliberately planned and result from conscious thought. Ideas are largely generated by the external world and involve recognizable human activities, using carefully planned illusionist devices. Gonsalves injects a sense of magic into realistic scenes. As a result, the term "Magic Realism" describes his work accurately. His work is an attempt to represent human beings' desire to believe the impossible, to be open to possibility.

Gonsalves exhibited at Art Expo New York and Los Angeles, Decor Atlanta and Las Vegas, Fine Art Forum, as well as one-man shows at Huckleberry Fine Art, Marcus Ashley Gallery in South Lake Tahoe, Hudson River Art Gallery, Saper Galleries (November 7 to December 31, 2004), Discovery Galleries, Ltd., and Kaleidoscope Gallery. Huckleberry Fine Art published the 1st limited edition prints which remains incomplete because of Gonsalves's death.

In June 2003, Simon & Schuster introduced North America and Canada to Imagine a Night, Gonsalves' first hardcover book featuring sixteen paintings. Due to the success of Imagine a Night, Simon & Schuster released a second book, Imagine A Day, in 2004 for which he won the 2005 Governor General's Award in the Children's Literature – Illustration category.

His book Imagine a Place was released in 2008. He released another book, Imagine a World, in September 2015.

The website robgonsalves.live was created in 2019 and is dedicated to keeping his legacy alive. Posters and eventually, new posthumous limited edition prints will become available.

Death and legacy
Gonsalves suffered from mental illness and ended his life on June 14, 2017. His official Facebook page stated in part "Rob Gonsalves battled the dark but succumbed June 14th." He was survived by his wife and extended family.

Fellow artist and widow, Lise Carruthers organized an effort to preserve his legacy in 2018. In 2019, a 4-foot-high black granite plinth was installed on his gravesite at the Necropolis Cemetery in Toronto Canada. Each side of the pedestal featured a different porcelain reproduction of a Gonsalves painting. Future plans are for a series of art exhibitions featuring Gonsalves original paintings.

In popular culture
In 2018, Ariana Grande released a music video for her song 'God is a Woman' in which most scene referenced Gonsalves' paintings "Water Dancing" and "Carved in Stone".

References

External links
 The Magic Realism of Rob Gonsalves at Saper Galleries (sapergalleries.com)
 
 The Art of Rob Gonsalves at Huckleberry Fine Art (www.huckleberryfineart.com)
 https://www.facebook.com/RobGonsalves.Official/
https://www.robgonsalves.live/ Family website

1959 births
2017 deaths
Canadian surrealist artists
Canadian children's book illustrators
Governor General's Award-winning children's illustrators
Artists from Toronto
20th-century Canadian painters
Canadian male painters
21st-century Canadian painters
20th-century Canadian male artists
21st-century Canadian male artists